Dinny Long (born 1949 in Millstreet, County Cork) is an Irish former Gaelic footballer. He played for his local clubs Millstreet and Austin Stacks and was a member of the Cork senior inter-county team from 1969 until 1977.

In 1973 during a carnival at Banteer, Long refereed a ladies' Gaelic football match between Kerry and Cork. This was one of the earliest ladies' Gaelic football inter-county games in Munster.

References

1949 births
Living people
Millstreet Gaelic footballers
Austin Stacks Gaelic footballers
Cork inter-county Gaelic footballers
Gaelic football referees